Sodium-dependent multivitamin transporter is a protein that in humans is encoded by the SLC5A6 gene.

The SMVT is a transporter for pantothenic acid (vitamin B5) and biotin (vitamin B7) at the blood–brain barrier. It is also a transporter for alpha lipoic acid and iodide. Transport of these nutrients is competitive and a surplus of a given nutrient may saturate the transporter and prevent the uptake of other nutrients.

References

Further reading 

 
 
 
 
 
 
 
 
 

Solute carrier family